Tournai-Ath-Mouscron is a parliamentary constituency in Belgium used to elect members of the Parliament of Wallonia since 1995. It corresponds to the arrondissements of Tournai, Ath and Mouscron.

Representatives

References

Constituencies of the Parliament of Wallonia